All Saints' Church in Thorp Arch, West Yorkshire, England is an active Anglican parish church in the Archdeaconry of York and the Diocese of York.

History
The church is of twelfth century origin (the south door being the sole remaining aspect of this era); although is mentioned in the earlier Domesday Book of 1086. with a fifteenth century tower; the remainder of the church was built between 1871 and 1872 to designs by G. E. Street.

Architectural style

The church is of dressed magnesian limestone with a red tile and Welsh slate roof.  The church has a fifteenth century west tower with offset diagonal buttresses, a three light west window and large square sundial, gargoyles to the north and south with a shield beneath the parapet.  The south porch is of twelfth century origin.  There is a four bay nave of gothic revival style, a two bay chancel and a north vestry.  The church has an ornate lychgate on the southern side of its boundaries.

See also
Listed buildings in Thorp Arch

References

External links
All Saints' Church Thorp Arch

Diocese of York
Church of England church buildings in West Yorkshire
Grade II listed churches in West Yorkshire